Glory TV is an international Christian non-denominational television channel catering to the British Indian and British Pakistani Christian communities, offering religious programming primarily in Punjabi and Urdu. It is the first Christian channel broadcasting live and recorded programming in Punjabi and Urdu within Europe.

Glory TV is based in London, with recording of various programs taking place in key Christian communities in the United Kingdom such as Slough, Hounslow, Leicester, Wolverhampton, Southall, Glasgow and other areas with prominent British Asian churches. Programs are also recorded in and broadcast from Italy, France and the Netherlands, where Punjabi- and Urdu-speaking Christians are located. Religious programming and tour footage from Israel are also shown on a daily basis.

Programming on occasion has also been aired in Gujarati and Nepali alongside English.

History 
Pam Munir is an Indian-born Sikh British national who established the channel alongside her husband Sarfraz Munir, a Pakistani-born non-practicing Christian and singer, after they both converted to Christianity following a religious encounter which led to Pam leaving Sikhism and Sarfraz becoming a practising Christian. The couple worked from a rented studio in London alongside a small dedicated team to produce Christian content on evangelism and Biblical teaching whilst being completely voluntarily funded and creating live programming whilst editing prerecorded footage. They currently are based mainly within Slough. The Munirs have four children together.

On 27 September 2014 Glory TV entertained the thoughts and opinions of inspirational Christian speakers, Howard and Renu Dwyer, the latter of the two gave a heartfelt testimony on her near death experience.

In 2014 Glory TV went off the air for a short time due to not being able to provide its broadcasting fees due to lack of funding as the channel relies entirely upon viewer donations.

Broadcasting
As the first channel of its kind to offer Christian television in Punjabi and Urdu in the United Kingdom, Glory TV has mobilised the South Asian Church in Britain and has created grounds of expansion and greater communication for the minority community. The channel has been a source of many conversions in particular from Sikhism and Islam with its efforts to send the Gospel and evangelise in every British Asian household across the United Kingdom and on an international scale to the wider Indian and Pakistani Christian community.

Regular content on Glory TV  
 Geet aur Zabur (psalms and Punjabi/Urdu Christian nasheed)
 Holy Land Tour (tour from Israel)
 Kalicia (discussion on Biblical topics)
 Awaam (global news affecting the Church)
 Bible Ki Nabouat (Biblical prophesy teaching)
 Meri Gawahi (talk show)
 Bandgi (worship)
 Aaj Ki Dish (South Asian cuisine show)
 Holy Bible Ki Baatein (Bible study)
 Masihi Sangeet (home church meetings)
 Khuda Ka Kalaam (Bible study)

External links
Glory TV official site
Glory TV official site
Glory TV media content
Glory TV YouTube channel

References

Religious television channels in the United Kingdom
Television channels and stations established in 2008
Christian mass media in the United Kingdom
Christian mass media in Israel
Christian television stations
British Pakistani mass media
British Indian mass media
Punjabi-language television channels
Urdu-language television channels